Anesidora was in Greek and Roman mythology an epithet of several goddesses and mythological figures. The name itself means "sender of gifts".

Mythology
Gaia
Pandora
Demeter

Other uses
 Anesidora, a fictional ship in the Alien franchise; see Alien: Isolation